"Just Fishin'" is a song written by Casey Beathard, Monty Criswell, and Ed Hill and recorded by American country music artist Trace Adkins. It was  released in March 2011 as the first single for his second album for Show Dog-Universal Music, Proud to Be Here. On November 30, 2011, the song received a Nomination in 54th Grammy Awards for Best Country Song. To date, this is Adkins final Top 10 hit.

Content
"Just Fishin'" is a song about a father who is fishing with his daughter. The little daughter only worries about catching fish but father says that they are not "just fishin'" but also making memories. It is in B major with a main chord pattern of B-E-B and a vocal range of G3-C5.

Critical reception
Blake Boldt of Engine 145 gave the song a "thumbs up", praising the "sharp details" and "little snapshots of domestic bliss" in the lyrics. It received a four-out-of-five star rating from Matt Bjorke of Roughstock, who said that it "finds Trace comfortably back in father mode". Both Bjorke and Boldt compared the song favorably to Adkins' earlier singles "Then They Do" and "You're Gonna Miss This". Kevin John Coyne, reviewing the song for Country Universe, gave it a B rating, saying that he wished the song weren't "quite so heavy-handed about driving home the theme; a subtler approach could have made it a Strait-type classic."

Music video
The music video was directed by Trey Fanjoy and premiered in June 2011. It features Trace and his youngest daughter, Trinity.

Chart performance
"Just Fishin'" entered the Hot Country Songs charts at number 40 on the chart dated for the week ending April 9, 2011. It also debuted at number 98 on the U.S. Billboard Hot 100 chart for the week of June 18, 2011. On the chart dated September 10, 2011, "Just Fishin'" entered the Top Ten, giving Adkins his first Top Ten single since "You're Gonna Miss This" in 2008. It peaked at number 6 in October 2011.

Charts

Year-end charts

Certifications

References

2011 singles
2011 songs
Country ballads
2010s ballads
Trace Adkins songs
Songs written by Casey Beathard
Music videos directed by Trey Fanjoy
Show Dog-Universal Music singles
Song recordings produced by Michael Knox (record producer)
Songs written by Ed Hill
Songs written by Monty Criswell
Songs about fathers